Waszkowo  is a village in the administrative district of Gmina Poniec, within Gostyń County, Greater Poland Voivodeship, in west-central Poland. In 2006 it had a population of approximately 160. It was in Leszno Voivodeship from 1975 to 1998.

The village is locally known for its early Renaissance church. The church was founded as an Evangelic temple but later became Roman Catholic.

References

External links 
 

Waszkowo